= Molyndeia =

Molyndeia (Ancient Greek: Μολύνδεια) was a town of ancient Lycia.

Its site is unlocated.
